Gerhard Rummel is an East German sprint canoeist who competed in the mid-1970s. He won two medals at the 1975 ICF Canoe Sprint World Championships in Belgrade with a gold in the K-2 1000 m and a silver in the K-4 1000 m events.

References

German male canoeists
Living people
Year of birth missing (living people)
ICF Canoe Sprint World Championships medalists in kayak